Big Stone Colony is an unincorporated community in Graceville Township, Big Stone County, Minnesota, United States, where, as of 2010 the population was 5,269.

References

Unincorporated communities in Big Stone County, Minnesota
Unincorporated communities in Minnesota